Kukkuzi dialect or Kukkusi dialect (Rus: Куровицы) is a dialect of Votic spoken in Kukkuzi the Kukkuzi dialect has been heavily influenced by Ingrian.

There exists a recording session of the Kukkuzi dialect, which was made in 2008–2012. A Kukkuzi dialect dictionary has been made in 1980. The Kukkuzi dialect has been declared to be dead since the 1970s, however three existing speakers have been located in 2006.

Classification 
According to E.B. Markus the Kukkuzi dialect has izhorian like vocabulary and phonetics, while containing Votic grammar which is a result of an incomplete language switch to Izhorian. However some linguists have claimed it rather as a dialect of Ingrian and some classify it as a mixed language In the past Kukkuzi has also sometimes been classified as a Finnish dialect.

According to Tiit-Rein Viitso, the Kukkuzi dialect was originally a Northern Finnic dialect (related to Finnish, Ingrian, Karelian and Veps) that was influenced by Votic and later the Lower Luga dialect of Ingrian.

Features 

 The sound õ exists in Votic but is absent in the Kukkuzi dialect.

 Some other features of the Kukkuzi dialect are the absence of the sound changes k > tš and s > ťś.

 The sound k sometimes becomes k' after a front vowel.

Samples 
tässä müü vassa ensimmäissä kertaa kuulimma, että müü oomma neitä vad'd'alaisiita.

'here we just for the first time heard, that we are Votians.'

lehmääk'ää 'with a cow'

References 

Votians
Extinct languages of Europe
Finnic languages